Alexandre Aparecido de Oliveira (born 22 January 1979) is a Brazilian footballer who currently plays for Londrina. 

Originally a winger with ability to play as an attacking midfielder, Oliveira was usually positioned by Al Wasl FC in the United Arab Emirates coaches as a second striker. 

He returned to Brazil to play for Botafogo, ending a six-year tenure with Al Wasl. Botafogo announced that he had signed a contract with the club upon passing a medical on June 29, 2011.

References

1979 births
Living people
Brazilian expatriate sportspeople in the United Arab Emirates
Brazilian footballers
Association football midfielders
Al-Wasl F.C. players
Paraná Clube players
Londrina Esporte Clube players
Botafogo de Futebol e Regatas players
Atlético Clube Goianiense players
UAE Pro League players
Expatriate footballers in the United Arab Emirates